The 1994 NCAA Skiing Championships were contested at Sugarloaf ski resort in Carrabassett Valley, Maine as the 40th annual NCAA-sanctioned ski tournament to determine the individual and team national champions of men's and women's collegiate slalom and cross-country skiing in the United States.

Vermont, coached by Chip LaCasse, won the team championship, the Catamounts' fifth title overall and fourth as a co-ed team.

Venue

This year's championships were contested at the Sugarloaf Resort in Carrabassett Valley, Maine

These were the second championships held at Sugarloaf (previously 1967) and third in the state of Maine (1967 and 1976).

Program

Men's events
 Cross country, 10 kilometer classical
 Cross country, 20 kilometer freestyle
 Slalom
 Giant slalom

Women's events
 Cross country, 5 kilometer classical
 Cross country, 15 kilometer freestyle
 Slalom
 Giant slalom

Team scoring

 DC – Defending champions

See also
 List of NCAA skiing programs

References

1994 in sports in Maine
NCAA Skiing Championships
NCAA Skiing Championships
1994 in alpine skiing
1994 in cross-country skiing